Željko Mrvaljević (Cyrillic: Жeљкo Mpвaљeвић; born 25 June 1979, in Bar) is a Montenegrin retired football defender.

Club career
Beside Montenegrin clubs FK Budućnost Podgorica, FK Bokelj, FK Mogren, FK Mornar and OFK Petrovac, he also played in Serbian FK Beograd, Polish Widzew Łódź, Zawisza Bydgoszcz and Zawisza Bydgoszcz, and in Albanian KS Vllaznia Shkodër.

External sources
 

1979 births
Living people
People from Bar, Montenegro
Association football defenders
Serbia and Montenegro footballers
Montenegrin footballers
FK Budućnost Podgorica players
FK Beograd players
FK Bokelj players
Widzew Łódź players
Zawisza Bydgoszcz players
FK Mogren players
FK Mornar players
Unia Janikowo players
OFK Petrovac players
KF Vllaznia Shkodër players
First League of Serbia and Montenegro players
Montenegrin First League players
Kategoria Superiore players
Serbia and Montenegro expatriate footballers
Expatriate footballers in Poland
Serbia and Montenegro expatriate sportspeople in Poland
Montenegrin expatriate footballers
Montenegrin expatriate sportspeople in Poland
Expatriate footballers in Albania
Montenegrin expatriate sportspeople in Albania
Montenegrin football managers
OFK Petrovac managers